Mask is a 1985 American biographical drama film directed by Peter Bogdanovich, starring Cher, Sam Elliott, and Eric Stoltz with supporting roles played by Dennis Burkley, Laura Dern, Estelle Getty, and Richard Dysart. Cher received the 1985 Cannes Film Festival award for Best Actress. The film is based on the life and early death of Roy L. "Rocky" Dennis, a boy who had craniodiaphyseal dysplasia, an extremely rare genetic disorder known commonly as lionitis due to the disfiguring cranial enlargements that it causes. Mask won the Academy Award for Best Makeup at the 58th ceremony, while Cher and Stoltz received Golden Globe Award nominations for their performances.

Plot
In 1978 Azusa, California, Rocky Dennis, with craniodiaphyseal dysplasia, is accepted without question by his freewheeling biker mother's boyfriends, his "extended motorcycle family," and his maternal grandparents who share his love of baseball card collecting; but is treated with fear, pity, awkwardness, and teasing by those unaware of his humanity, humor, and intelligence. Rocky's mother, Florence "Rusty" Dennis, is determined to give Rocky as normal a life as possible, in spite of her own wild ways as a member of the Turks biker gang, as well as her strained relationship with her father. She fights for Rocky's inclusion in a mainstream junior high school, and confronts a principal who would rather classify Rocky as intellectually disabled and relegate him to a special education school, despite the fact that his condition has not affected his intelligence. At Rocky's semi-annual physical, Rocky claims to be feeling pretty well, despite recurring headaches that his mother can remedy by simply singing to them. A young doctor tells Rusty that Rocky's life expectancy is limited to six more months, which Rusty scoffs at, exclaiming that many other doctors have made claims about Rocky's condition that were completely unfounded.

Rocky thrives at school, making friends by assisting a fellow student with remembering his locker combination, and winning over a class by using humor when faced with an awkward silence during roll call, where Rocky just repeats the prior new student's line, "Wow, thanks a lot." He shows his brilliance in history class by giving a unique rendition of the Greek myth about the Trojan Horse and it being the turning point of the Trojan War. Gradually overcoming discrimination and tutoring his classmates for $3 per hour, Rocky is asked by the principal to accept a job as a counselor's aide at Camp Bloomfield, a summer camp for blind children. At his graduation from junior high, Rocky takes home academic achievement prizes in mathematics, history, and science.

Rocky feels the need to leave his chronically depressed and drug-addicted mother, and helps her break her drug habit. At camp, Rocky falls in love with Diana Adams, a blind girl who cannot see (but feels) his deformed skull and is entranced by Rocky's kindness and compassion. Rocky uses his intelligence to explain to Diana words like "billowy," "clouds," "red," and "green" by using cotton balls as a touchable vision of "billowy clouds," a warm rock to explain "red" and "pink," and a frozen rock to explain "icy blue." At the end of camp, Diana introduces Rocky to her parents, who are quickly flabbergasted by Rocky's deformed appearance, and in response forbid Diana to spend time with him.

Later, Rocky faces the pain of separation from the two people to which he feels closest. His lifelong dream of a motorbike trip through Europe collapses when his best friend Ben, who was to come with him, reveals to him that he is permanently moving back to Michigan to go live with his father. This drives Rocky into berating Ben and calling him "stupid", then finally revealing to Ben that he conned him out of a Rube Walker card. Rocky also finds it difficult to thrive at high school, where none of his previous friends are, and he responds with hostility towards those who make fun of him, when he used to humorously shrug it off. However, Rocky feels better after taking a bus trip by himself to visit Diana at the equestrian stables, located near Griffith Park. Diana reveals to Rocky that her parents had prevented her from receiving his phone messages and are sending her to a private boarding school for the blind. Despite this, Rocky vows that no matter how separated they're going to be, they will always love each other, and will always be together.

One evening when Rocky's biker family is visiting, Rocky is fighting a fierce headache and quietly withdraws to his room, removes the tacks from his map of Europe, and goes to bed. The next morning, Rusty tries to wake up Rocky for school and flies into a fit of grief-stricken rage when she realizes he has died. After destroying the kitchen, Rusty mourns the death of Rocky and says, "Now you can go anywhere you want, baby." as she re-pins his map of Europe.

The film ends with Rocky's biker family, Rusty, Gar, and Dozer, visiting his grave, leaving flowers and some 1955 Brooklyn Dodgers baseball cards by his headstone, as Rocky's voice is heard reciting the poem he wrote earlier for English class.

Cast

Production
Rusty Dennis sold the film rights to Rocky's life story for $15,000, most of which went to pay medical bills for her son Joshua who was undergoing AIDS treatments. She originally hoped the film would focus on Rocky's life and intrepid personality rather than giving equal emphasis to her story, but was won over by Cher's role, stating: "Cher depicted the way I am very well. I always thought I was perfectly normal, that the rest of the world is nuts."

In 1984 camp scenes for the movie were filmed at Camp Bloomfield. Campers and staff got a preview of the finished film at Universal Studios in February, 1985.

Bogdanovich had originally intended to use several songs by Bruce Springsteen, the real Rocky Dennis' favorite singer. But due to an impasse at the time between Universal Pictures and Springsteen's label, Columbia Records, the songs were pulled from the film and replaced with songs by Bob Seger for the original theatrical release. Rusty Dennis was unhappy with this, and voiced her displeasure in a 1985 appearance on San Francisco talk show, People Are Talking, saying: "I don't think [Rocky] even knew who Bob Seger was". Bogdanovich sued Universal for $19 million, alleging the film studio switched the music without his approval in violation of his final cut privilege. The Springsteen songs were eventually restored for the 2004 director's cut DVD of the film.

Reception

Box office
The film was a box office success, garnering  in total.

Critical reception
Reviews were mostly positive. , the film has a 93% approval rating on review aggregator Rotten Tomatoes, based on 28 reviews, with an average rating of 7.5/10.

Roger Ebert wrote of the film, "A wonderful movie, a story of high spirits and hope and courage," with Stoltz's performance establishing a believable character that transcends his deformity and Cher's characterization of Rusty as "one of the most interesting movie characters in a long time." Gene Siskel described Mask as "superb" and also singled out Cher's portrayal of Rusty as the heart of the film, but criticized the marketing campaign that kept Stoltz's face secretive as a revival of a freak show mentality. Dolores Barclay of the Associated Press declared Mask was "directed with great sensitivity by Peter Bogdanovich" and carried by Cher and Stoltz's performances but believed the depiction of Rusty's biker friends was "perhaps a bit too sanitized to be believable." A contrasting review by Vincent Canby in The New York Times read in part, "Mask is one of those movies that try so hard to get their supposedly universal message across (don't we all hide behind a mask of one sort or another?) that they are likely to put your teeth on edge more often than they bring one little, lonely teardrop to the eye."

Awards
Michael Westmore and Zoltan Elek won the Academy Award for Best Makeup and Hairstyling in the 58th Academy Awards.

The film was nominated by the American Film Institute for the 2006 list AFI's 100 Years...100 Cheers.

See also

 The Elephant Man (film)
 Wonder (film)
 "The Post-Modern Prometheus"—An episode of The X-Files that makes references to this film.

References

External links

 
 
 
 
 
 

1985 drama films
1985 films
1980s American films
1980s biographical drama films
1980s English-language films
American biographical drama films
American coming-of-age films
Drama films based on actual events
Films about disability
Films about disability in the United States
Films about mother–son relationships
Films directed by Peter Bogdanovich
Films set in 1978
Films set in California
Films that won the Academy Award for Best Makeup
Universal Pictures films